The Cedar Creek Bridge near Elgin, Kansas, on FAS 96, was built in 1927.  Also known as Elgin Cedar Creek Bridge, it was listed on the National Register of Historic Places in 1983.

It is a single span reinforced concrete rainbow arch bridge. The rainbow arch, also known as Marsh arch, was a design of James Barney Marsh.

References

Bridges on the National Register of Historic Places in Kansas
Bridges completed in 1927
Chautauqua County, Kansas
Bridges in Kansas